Urmas Kirs (born 5 November 1966) is an Estonian football manager and a retired footballer. He lastly coached the Estonian Meistriliiga club Tarvas. He played in the position of defender. Kirs spent the most of his career in Flora.

International career
Kirs won a total of 80 international caps for the Estonia national football team. He earned his first official cap on 3 June 1992, when Estonia played Slovenia in a friendly match.

Career statistics

International goals

References

External links

1966 births
Living people
Sportspeople from Viljandi
Estonian footballers
Estonian football managers
Estonia international footballers
Meistriliiga players
Veikkausliiga players
Viljandi JK Tulevik players
FC Flora players
FC Elva players
Estonian expatriate footballers
Expatriate footballers in Finland
Estonian expatriate sportspeople in Finland
Association football defenders